MeliBio is an American food tech company that replaces the use of honeybees with microorganisms as a medium for honey production. The company was founded in 2020 by Darko Mandich and Aaron Schaller.

MeliBio is based in Oakland, California.

History
MeliBio was founded in 2020 by Darko Mandich and Aaron Schaller in Berkeley, California. The company uses plant science and precision fermentation to produce honey without the need for bees.

In March 2022, MeliBio raised $5.7 million in seed funding. The round was led by Astanor Ventures.

References

Food and drink companies established in 2020
2020 establishments in California